The Regina Thunder, originally known as the Prairie Thunder, are a junior football club, based out of Regina, Saskatchewan. The Thunder are a part of the Prairie Football Conference (PFC), which is a six-member conference with teams from all three prairie provinces. The PFC is a member of the Canadian Junior Football League, and participates in national championships with two other conferences, based out of Ontario and British Columbia.

Each year the Thunder compete with their provincial rivals, the Saskatoon Hilltops for the Shrine Bowl. The Shrine Bowl is awarded to the team who has the highest total points in the two regular season games between each other.

2013 was a huge year for the Thunder as they defeated the three time defending CJFL champions 21-16 in Saskatoon. They would go on to defeat the V.I. Raiders in the CJFL championship 55-26, in Regina.

Notable Thunder Alumni
Jeff Yorga – Toronto Argonauts, Offensive Lineman
Chris Getzlaf – Saskatchewan Roughriders Receiver
Stu Foord – Saskatchewan Roughriders Running Back
Paul Woldu – Saskatchewan Roughriders Defensive Back
Ivan Brown – Montreal Alouettes Defensive Lineman
Dan Clark – Saskatchewan Roughriders Offensive Lineman
Zack Evans – Saskatchewan Roughriders Defensive Lineman
Rory Kohlert – Winnipeg Blue Bombers Receiver
Logan Ferland – Saskatchewan Roughriders Offensive Lineman

Coaching staff

Gallery

References

External links
Canadian Junior Football League

Canadian Junior Football League teams
Sport in Regina, Saskatchewan
Canadian football teams in Saskatchewan